Several ships of the French Navy have borne the name Atlas:

Atlas (1738), a 50-gun ship, wrecked in 1739.
 Atlas (1766), the refitted prize known as  until 1766, sunk off Ushant in 1781
Broken up in 1817.
 , a 74-gun ship, was renamed Atlas at the end of the Empire. She became a hulk in 1819.

French Navy ship names